Hasilpur (Punjabi and ), is a city in Hasilpur Tehsil of Bahawalpur District in southern Punjab, Pakistan.

References

Populated places in Bahawalpur District